The Muddy Creek Bridge, Maryland and Pennsylvania Railroad is a historic Pratt through truss railroad bridge in Lower Chanceford Township and Peach Bottom Township, York County, Pennsylvania.  It was built about 1909, and measures about  overall. It was built by the Maryland and Pennsylvania Railroad and crosses Muddy Creek.

It was added to the National Register of Historic Places in 1995.

References

Railroad bridges on the National Register of Historic Places in Pennsylvania
Bridges completed in 1909
Bridges in York County, Pennsylvania
National Register of Historic Places in York County, Pennsylvania
Pratt truss bridges in the United States